Ponapea hentyi is a species of palm tree. It is endemic to Papua New Guinea, where it is restricted to New Britain in the Bismarck Archipelago. It is threatened by habitat loss.

The Latin specific epithet of hentyi refers to plant collector and botanist E.E. Henty, (fl. 1969).

References

Ptychospermatinae
Endemic flora of Papua New Guinea
Endangered plants
Taxonomy articles created by Polbot